The Queensland Railways 2170 class is an Australian diesel-electric locomotive.

All were built between 1982 and 1984 by Clyde Engineering at Comeng's Rocklea plant for Queensland Rail. Most have been sold for further use overseas with seventeen going to South Africa and twelve to Ferronor in Chile.

The 2100 class family
The Queensland Railways 2100 class first entered service in 1970. The class family consists of the 2100, 2130, 2150 and 2170 classes. It formed the mainstay of Queensland Rail's coal haulage from the opening of the Goonyella line until electrification in the late 1980s.

A new batch of locomotives was ordered with the opening of each new mine and the 2170 class entered service when the German Creek, Oaky Creek and Blair Athol coal mines came into operation. Eleven units were built with Locotrol equipment.

Manufacturer

The 2170 class was an evolution of the 2150 class. It differed from the earlier class mainly by having modified traction motors, Dash 2 modular electrical cabinets and air-conditioned cabs.

The locomotives were built by Clyde Engineering at Comeng's Rocklea plant between 1982 and 1984.

Modifications
Since the late 1980s, the locomotives have been modified. Modified locomotives had a letter suffix added to their unit numbers. These modifications include:
 A suffix. Weight reduction by reducing fuel tank capacity by 1,300 litres, 2195 only
 D suffix. A driver-only operation (DOO) cab modification, which included lowering the nose of the locomotive and the addition of a larger windscreen for the driver.
 F suffix. The addition of auxiliary fuel tanks.

In 1992-1993, all except numbers 2202 to 2210 were fitted with Automatic train protection (ATP). Between 1995 and 1999 eleven received extended cabs to relieve cramping caused by the ATP equipment.

In 2000, an overhaul program commenced which included the fitting of maxi-cabs, similar to that of the 2300 class, to all 43 remaining units. After this, thirty were in "D" configuration with the other thirteen in "F" configuration. Some were fitted with ZTR Nexsys II traction control systems.

Service
The 2170 class entered service on coal haulage on the Goonyella line. After electrification, all except numbers 2202 to 2210 were placed into general traffic between Brisbane and the South West and on the North Coast line between Rockhampton and Townsville. Meanwhile, numbers 2202 to 2210 were relocated to Townsville in 1988 to haul Greenvale mineral trains and, from 1993, trains on the Mount Isa line. In the late 1990s, they were re-allocated to Gladstone to operate Moura line coal trains.

When the 4100 class entered service, the 2170 class began to be withdrawn from service. Along with Queensland Rail's freight operations, all, apart from 2195, passed to QR National (now Aurizon) in July 2010.

Disposal
Many of the 2170 class have been sold by Aurizon.
 In August 2013, three were placed on consignment with Apex Industrial and exported to South Africa. They were shipped from Brisbane to Durban on the ship BBC Carolina on 22 August 2013. Two were sold to African Rail & Traction Services while the third went to RRL Grindrod Locomotives.
 In July 2014, three were sold by Aurizon back to Queensland Rail to haul its passenger trains.
 In 2014, fourteen were purchased by Transnet Freight Rail and exported to South Africa as the Class .
 In June 2016, twelve were sold to Ferronor in Chile.

Transnet Freight Rail

At least eight of the Class  units were allocated to the Western Cape system and are based at Bellville Locomotive Depot. Of those, at least six have been superficially repainted in a shop version of the red Transnet Freight Rail livery and appear to be in service working the West Coast lines. In most cases the old Aurizon numbers are still visible under the red paint. Repainting was done only on the upper bodywork and everything from the running boards down were left as it was. This includes the buffer beams and cowcatchers, probably since the Australian yellow and grey chevron pattern on the buffer beams is an inverted version of the yellow and grey pattern used by Transnet Freight Rail. At least four of the remaining units are believed to have been allocated to the Eastern Cape system.

Watco Australia
In 2019, after being awarded a grain haulage contract in Queensland, Watco Australia purchased 5 of the 2170s sold to Transnet (2180, 2181, 2183, 2184 and 2188) and shipped them back to Queensland by NGL Projects. They arrived at the Port of Brisbane on 2 July 2019, and the first loco, 2188D, was transferred to Watco's new facilities in Warwick on 31 July 2019. They will be used on Watco's upcoming grain services, in conjunction with the brand new WRA class, currently being built by NRE in the United States.

Status table
The present owner, builder's works numbers, dates in service and disposition are listed in the table.

Gallery

References

External links

Aurizon diesel locomotives
Cape gauge railway locomotives
Clyde Engineering locomotives
Co-Co locomotives
3460
Diesel locomotives of Queensland
Electro-Motive Division locomotives
Railway locomotives introduced in 1982
Queensland Rail locomotives
Diesel-electric locomotives of Australia
3 ft 6 in gauge locomotives of Australia